Marchisano is a surname. Notable people with the surname include:

Elena-Cristina Marchisano (born 1979), Romanian actress
Francesco Marchisano (1929–2014), Italian cardinal

See also
Matteo Marchisano-Adamo (born 1973), American sound designer, film editor and composer